Anthony Tucker may refer to:

 Anthony Tucker (basketball) (born 1969), American basketball player
 Anthony Tucker (American football) (born 1976), American football player and coach
 P. J. Tucker (Anthony Leon Tucker Jr.; born 1985), American basketball player
 The Beat Bully (Anthony Tucker; fl. 2000s), American record producer

See also
 Anthony Tucker-Jones (born 1964), British military analyst and author
 Tucker Anthony, American investment banking firm